Esenbeckia is a genus of neotropical horse flies in the family Tabanidae.

Species
Esenbeckia abata Philip, 1954
Esenbeckia accincta Wilkerson & Fairchild, 1983
Esenbeckia affinis Kröber, 1931
Esenbeckia arcuata (Williston, 1895)
Esenbeckia auribrunnea Gualdrón-Díaz & Gorayeb, 2020
Esenbeckia balteata Wilkerson, 1979
Esenbeckia balzapambana Enderlein, 1925
Esenbeckia bassleri Wilkerson & Fairchild, 1983
Esenbeckia bella Philip, 1961
Esenbeckia biclausa Wilkerson & Fairchild, 1982
Esenbeckia bitriangulata Lutz & Castro, 1935
Esenbeckia breedlovei Philip, 1978
Esenbeckia caustica (Osten Sacken, 1886)
Esenbeckia chagresensis Fairchild, 1942
Esenbeckia cisandeana Wilkerson & Fairchild, 1983
Esenbeckia clari Lutz, 1909
Esenbeckia curtipalpis Philip, 1954
Esenbeckia delta (Hine, 1920)
Esenbeckia deltachi Philip, 1978
Esenbeckia diaphana (Schiner, 1868)
Esenbeckia dichroa (Brèthes, 1910)
Esenbeckia distinguenda Lutz & Castro, 1935
Esenbeckia downsi Philip, 1954
Esenbeckia dressleri Wilkerson & Fairchild, 1983
Esenbeckia dubia Lutz, 1909
Esenbeckia ecuadorensis Lutz & Castro, 1935
Esenbeckia enderleini Kröber, 1931
Esenbeckia erebea Wilkerson & Fairchild, 1983
Esenbeckia esenbeckii (Wiedemann, 1830)
Esenbeckia fairchildi Philip, 1943
Esenbeckia farraginis Fairchild & Wilkerson, 1981
Esenbeckia fascipennis (Macquart, 1838)
Esenbeckia fidenodes (Enderlein, 1922)
Esenbeckia filipalpis (Williston, 1895)
Esenbeckia divergens Philip, 1969
Esenbeckia flavescens Lutz, 1909
Esenbeckia flavohirta (Bellardi, 1859)
Esenbeckia fuscipennis (Wiedemann, 1828)
Esenbeckia fenestrata Lutz, 1909
Esenbeckia fuscipes Enderlein, 1925
Esenbeckia geminorum Fairchild & Wilkerson, 1981
Esenbeckia gertschi Philip, 1954
Esenbeckia gracilipalpis Chainey & Hall, 1996
Esenbeckia gracilis Kröber, 1931
Esenbeckia griseipleura Chainey & Hall, 1996
Esenbeckia hirsutipalpus Wilkerson & Fairchild, 1982
Esenbeckia hoguei Philip, 1973
Esenbeckia illota (Williston, 1901)
Esenbeckia osornoi Fairchild, 1942
Esenbeckia planaltina Fairchild, 1971
Esenbeckia incerta (Bellardi, 1859)
Esenbeckia incisuralis (Say, 1823)
Esenbeckia tinkhami Philip, 1954
Esenbeckia infrataeniata Lutz & Castro, 1935
Esenbeckia insignis Kröber, 1931
Esenbeckia jalisco Burger, 1999
Esenbeckia keelifera Philip, 1973
Esenbeckia laticlava Wilkerson & Fairchild, 1983
Esenbeckia leechi Philip, 1978
Esenbeckia lugubris (Macquart, 1838)
Esenbeckia matogrossensis Lutz, 1911
Esenbeckia media Burger, 1999
Esenbeckia mejiai Fairchild, 1942
Esenbeckia melanogaster Lutz & Castro, 1935
Esenbeckia melanopa (Hine, 1920)
Esenbeckia mexicana Philip, 1954
Esenbeckia micheneri (Philip, 1954)
Esenbeckia micheneri Philip, 1954
Esenbeckia minor Kröber, 1931
Esenbeckia minuscula Wilkerson, 1979
Esenbeckia neglecta Lutz, 1911
Esenbeckia nigricorpus Lutz, 1909
Esenbeckia nigriventris Kröber, 1931
Esenbeckia nigronotata (Macquart, 1850)
Esenbeckia nigrovillosa Kröber, 1931
Esenbeckia nitens Philip, 1973
Esenbeckia notabilis (Walker, 1850)
Esenbeckia obscurithorax Lutz & Castro, 1935
Esenbeckia painteri Philip, 1968
Esenbeckia parishi (Hine, 1920)
Esenbeckia pavida (Williston, 1901)
Esenbeckia pechumani Wilkerson & Fairchild, 1983
Esenbeckia perspicua Wilkerson & Fairchild, 1983
Esenbeckia peruviana Burger, 1999
Esenbeckia planiventris (Macquart, 1850)
Esenbeckia potrix Philip, 1969
Esenbeckia prasiniventris (Macquart, 1846)
Esenbeckia punctiventer Fairchild & Wilkerson, 1981
Esenbeckia reinburgi Surcouf, 1919
Esenbeckia rostrum Philip, 1943
Esenbeckia saussurei (Bellardi, 1859)
Esenbeckia schlingeri Philip, 1960
Esenbeckia schusteri Philip, 1973
Esenbeckia scionodes Philip, 1973
Esenbeckia semiflava (Wiedemann, 1830)
Esenbeckia seminuda (Coquillett, 1902)
Esenbeckia subguttata Fairchild, 1964
Esenbeckia subvaria (Walker, 1848)
Esenbeckia suturalis (Rondani, 1848)
Esenbeckia tepicana (Townsend, 1912)
Esenbeckia testaceiventris (Macquart, 1848)
Esenbeckia tetragoniphora Lutz & Castro, 1935
Esenbeckia tigrina Wilkerson, 1979
Esenbeckia tinctipennis Kröber, 1931
Esenbeckia translucens (Macquart, 1846)
Esenbeckia triangularis Philip, 1954
Esenbeckia tristis Kröber, 1931
Esenbeckia tucumana Brèthes, 1910
Esenbeckia vulpes (Wiedemann, 1828)
Esenbeckia weemsi Philip, 1966
Esenbeckia wiedemanni (Bellardi, 1859)
Esenbeckia wygodzinskyi Wilkerson & Fairchild, 1983
Esenbeckia xanthoskela Wilkerson & Fairchild, 1983
Esenbeckia yepocapa Fairchild, 1951

References

Tabanidae
Taxa named by Camillo Rondani
Brachycera genera
Diptera of North America
Diptera of South America